Central Alaskan Yup'ik may refer to:
 Central Alaskan Yup'ik people
 Central Alaskan Yup'ik language